The Tenth Finance Commission of India was incorporated in the year 1992 consisting of Shri Krishna Chandra Pant as the chairman.

Members
The members of the commission were:

 Shri Krishna Chandra Pant, Chairman
 Dr. Debi Prasad Pal, Member of Parliament
 Shri B.P.R. Vithal
 Dr. C. Rangarajan, resigned on 21 December 1992
 Shri M.C. Gupta, Member Secretary, relinquished charge on 31 January 1994
 Shri Manu R. Shroff, In place of Dr. C. Rangarajan on 14 October 1993
 Shri Arun Sinha, Member Secretary (in place of M.C. Gupta) on 1 March 1994

Recommendations
The commission recommended that:
 The share of the Union Territories would not be determined on the grounds used for state share but it would be decided on the basis of population solely. The percentage would be 0.927% for the years 1995–2000.
 Out of the total income obtained from certain central taxes and duties, 29% should go to the states. This is known as the 'Alternative Scheme of Devolution' and came into effect retrospectively from April 1, 1996.
 The proceeds from the ‘penalties’ and ‘interest recovered’ under the miscellaneous receipts should be included in to the divisible income tax pool as recommended by Ninth Commission with effect from 1 April 1995.
 The share of the net proceeds would be 77.5% for five years.
 The commission dropped the collection factor as the criterion for distribution
 The distribution of the net proceeds among states would be as follows:-
 20% on the basis of population of 1971
 60% on basis of distance of per capita income
 5% on basis of area adjusted
 5% on basis of infrastructure index
 10% on basis of tax effort

References

Further References 
 
 

Finance Commission of India
1995 establishments in India